Crane Ridge is a 6 mile long ridge of the Diablo Range in Alameda County, California. Crane Ridge runs southeast from the Livermore Valley toward Mount Wallace.

References 

Landforms of Alameda County, California
Diablo Range
La Vereda del Monte